Development West Coast is a charitable trust that operates in the West Coast region of New Zealand.

Origin 
Development West Coast (DWC) has its origins in the controversy over logging native trees by Timberlands West Coast Limited, a former state-owned enterprise based on the West Coast. In the late 1990s, Timberlands' actions were supported by then-prime minister Jenny Shipley and opposed by environmental groups, led by Native Forest Action. The controversy became an election issue in the 1999 general election, with the Labour Party committing itself to stop logging. Investigative journalist Nicky Hager published a book, Secrets and Lies, just prior to the election, alleging that Timberlands had hired a public relations firm, Shandwick (now Weber Shandwick), to run a smear campaign against Native Forest Action.

Labour won the 1999 election and stopped logging on the West Coast. The forests were transferred to the Department of Conservation and in recognition this and the privatisation of much West Coast infrastructure in the late 1990s the region was compensated with an endowment fund of NZ$92 million. Development West Coast was set up in 2001 as a trust to administer this fund.

Finances 
In the 2015–2016 financial year, Development West Coast approved 20 loans worth a total of $14.4 million; in 2016–2017 it loaned $12.3 million to 18 businesses. It returned a profit of $5.3 million, after running a deficit in 2015. It had 11.5 staff positions and the Chief Executive was Chris Mackenzie, on a salary of $223,000.

In 2021, in its 20th year, DWC's fund had grown from $92 million to $146 million. In 2019 it approved 80% of loan applications received, distributing $2.2 million, and gave $1.9 million to community projects. In the year ending March 2021, it issued $6.7 million in loans, distributed $3.5 million to the community, and made a $14.2 million net profit. It had 20 full-time staff under Chief Executive Heath Milne.

Projects 

DWC contributed $1.25 million in 2010 to the creation of the 85 km Old Ghost Road, New Zealand's longest back country cycle trail.

In 2015, DWC added a $5 million Business and Industry Stimulus Fund to provide loans to new or struggling West Coast businesses. One outcome of this was the establishment of EPIC Westport, a Westport technology centre and business incubator able to house 25 full-time workers and a dozen "hot-desk" users. EPIC Westport was a spin-off of the Enterprise Precinct Innovation Centre in Christchurch.

In 2016 Fox Glacier received $1 million for a new community centre and the RSA in Hokitika $400,000 for a new hall.

DWC has financially supported the revival of Reefton, funding the Reefton Shop Front Project to restore its Victorian-era streetscape, and contributing to the Reefton Powerhouse Trust, which aims to restore the original 1888 powerhouse on the Inangahua River that gave Reefton the first electric streetlighting in the southern hemisphere.

DWC is a shareholder in Te Ara Pounamu Ltd, which will spend $17.87 million developing new visitor centres in Westport, Greymouth, Hokitika, and Haast.

In response to the COVID-19 pandemic in New Zealand and the loss of tourism revenue, DWC pledged $5 million to support businesses in Fox Glacier and Franz Josef. They approached Tourism Minister Stuart Nash for an additional $35 million in support, but Nash suggested DWC release 10 per cent of its fund instead, suggesting the "rainy day" it was set up for had arrived. DWC supported the creation of Now Open, an online directory of 180 local businesses that were operating under Level 3 restriction, and funded rebates for businesses switching to online delivery.

References

2001 establishments in New Zealand
Organisations based in New Zealand
West Coast, New Zealand